Charles Hess Miller (December 30, 1877 – January 13, 1951) was an American professional baseball player. At the age of 37, he appeared in one game in Major League Baseball for the Baltimore Terrapins on October 2, 1915.  Pinch hitting for second baseman John Gallagher with two outs in the bottom of the ninth inning, and with the Terrapins down 7–1, Miller struck out to end the game.

External links

Baltimore Terrapins players
Baseball players from Pennsylvania
1877 births
1951 deaths
People from Lancaster County, Pennsylvania